Nizhegorodskaya Street (Nizhegorodskaya Ulitsa) is a street in Moscow, Russia.

Name
It is named for Nizhegorodsky Station, which was built in 1861 and closed in the 1950s. That station in turn was named for Nizhny Novgorod.

Location

The street is located in Tagansky District of the Central Administrative Okrug, south of the former Nizhegorodsky Station.

References

Streets in Moscow
Central Administrative Okrug